Rafat Ali Al-Akhali is a Yemeni politician and economist. He served as Minister of Youth and Sports in the Government of Yemen.

References 

Youth and Sports ministers of Yemen
21st-century Yemeni politicians
Bahah Cabinet
Living people
Year of birth missing (living people)